Quisuargaga or Kiswar Qaqa (Quechua kiswar Buddleja incana, qaqa rock, "kiswar rock") is a mountain in the Andes of Peru, about  high. It is situated in the Ancash Region, Huari Province, Huari District.  Quisuargaga lies on the eastern border of the buffer zone of the Huascarán National Park.

References

Mountains of Peru
Mountains of Ancash Region